is a private university in Chiyoda, Tokyo, Japan, established in 1963. The school has a branch campus in Machida, Tokyo. The predecessor of the school was founded in 1925.

Though the two share the same historical roots (and website), this school and Tokyo Kasei-Gakuin Junior College are distinct institutions.

In the 1990s, the Tsukuba Gakuin University was a women's university named as a branch of the Tokyo Kasei Gakuin.

External links
 Official website 
 Official website 

 
Educational institutions established in 1925
Private universities and colleges in Japan
Machida, Tokyo
1925 establishments in Japan
Chiyoda, Tokyo
Women's universities and colleges in Japan